Ristorante Machiavelli is an Italian restaurant in Seattle's Capitol Hill neighborhood, in the U.S. state of Washington. The business bills itself as "a Capitol Hill tradition since 1988".

History 
Suzette Jarding is the owner, as of 2018. According to Seattle magazine, the restaurant's menu has changed little in three decades.

Reception 
Seattle Metropolitan has said, "The veal is a house specialty and a guilty pleasure; the steak, known among cognoscenti, is a triumph."

See also 

 List of Italian restaurants

References

External links 
 
 Ristorante Machiavelli at Zomato

1988 establishments in Washington (state)
Capitol Hill, Seattle
Italian restaurants in Seattle
Restaurants established in 1988